Trieschmann is a surname. Notable people with the surname include:

Burke Trieschmann, American composer and sound designer who provides music for film and video games
Charles Trieschmann (1920–2015), American author, photographer, movie producer and attorney